Munganga is a Congolese surname. Notable people with the surname include:

Jean Munganga (born 1990), Congolese footballer
Kasongo Munganga (born 1944), Congolese politician and monetarist
Nelson Munganga (born 1993), Congolese football player

Surnames of African origin